Katensen is a small village in Lower Saxony that is part of the town Uetze, the village is located about 30 km East of Hanover. not to be confused with Katensen (Offen)

History 
Katensen was first recorded in 1265 in the Document Bishop Otto of Hildesheim, in September 2015 it celebrated its 750th Birthday.

Coat of Arms 
The coat of arms is divided into three parts. In the upper blue field it contains two crossed scythes (as a reference to agriculture), below that in a yellow field a blue red-armored Brunswick lion (because of the affiliation to the former Brunswick-Lüneburg region). The final part is a blue field rounded off towards the bottom with a silver old Germanic wolf's tang as a reminder of the affiliation to the district of Burgdorf.

History

Culture and sights

Clubs 
Sports Club - TSV Katensen - http://www.tsv-katensen.de/

Shooting Club - Schützenverein - http://www.sv-katensen.de/

Volunteer fire department inc. Youth - Freiwilligen Feuerwehr - http://www.feuerwehr-katensen.de/

Horse Riding Club - Reit- und Fahrverein - http://www.rv-uetze.de/

Transport

Airport 
Katensen has a small private airport with a Grass Landing strip suitable for light aircraft

Bus 
There are 2 Bus Stops in the Village, which is on the Line 950, operated by GVH

Train 
The closest train station to Katensen is in the Village of Dollbergen, the Train Station is on the Berlin-Lehrte line. The RE30 route links the City of Wolfsburg to the east and Hanover to the West and is operated by the company Metronom

Politics

Local Council 
The local council of Katensen consists of five councillors of the following parties:

 Freie Wählergemeinschaft Katensen: 5 seats

Mayor 
The Town Mayor is Olaf Reese from the party "Freie Wählergemeinschaft Katensen"

References 

Hanover Region
Villages in Lower Saxony